HJ may refer to:

Science, technology, and mathematics 
 Hall–Janko group, a mathematical group
 U.S. code for a cryptographic key change; see cryptoperiod

Other uses 
 , a two-letter combination used in some languages
 /hj/, a pronunciation cluster, sometimes reduced
 Hajji (Hj.), an Islamic honorific
 Handjob
 hic jacet ('here lies'), Latin phrase on gravestones 
 Hilal-i-Jurat, post-nominal for Pakistan honour
 Hitler-Jugend (Hitler Youth)
 Holden HJ, an Australian car 1974-1976
 Hot Jupiter, a type of planet
 Tasman Cargo Airlines, IATA airline designator